Semiothisa troni is a moth of the family Geometridae. It was described by Christian Guillermet in 2011 and is endemic to Réunion.

The wingspan is 30–35 mm.

See also 
 List of moths of Réunion

References

Moths described in 2011
Ennominae
Endemic fauna of Réunion
Moths of Réunion